The West Vancouver Memorial Library (WVML) is a public library that serves the district municipality of West Vancouver, British Columbia, Canada.

Early history

The library was founded in 1950 as a memorial to honour those who gave their lives during World War II so future generations would have the freedom to pursue knowledge without let or hindrance. 
Although West Vancouver Memorial Library did not officially open its doors until November 11, 1950, the District of West Vancouver was peppered with small circulating libraries throughout the first half of the twentieth century.  As early as 1919, Mrs. Effie M. Field was loaning books from her dry goods and children's clothing store at 14th St. and Bellevue Ave.; however, in 1921, the Hollyburn Public Library Association took over Mrs. Field's modest collection of books, with the intention of turning it into a municipally funded public library.  By 1926, the library's collection grew to over 1000 books, and after moving into George Gimmill's modern drug store at 1402 Marine Dr., the library was able to expand even further.

Harsh economic times during the 1930s led to sharp reductions in provincial funding, and in 1933, the library was officially closed.  West Vancouver residents were deeply affected by the Great Depression, although throughout the latter half of the decade, there was a proliferation of small private lending libraries in a number of stationery and gift shops.

With the onset of the Second World War, the economy of West Vancouver was centered on the War effort, along with the rest of Canada, but by the summer of 1944, a petition requesting the establishment of a municipal public library was presented to West Vancouver Municipal Council. On December 16, the by-law was approved, and shortly after the end of the War, the municipality voted that a library be constructed as a War Memorial.

Later history
Designed by West Vancouver architect R. A. D. Berwick, the library was opened on November 11, 1950 with Elizabeth Musto as the library's first official librarian. Shortly thereafter, a stained glass window was generously donated to the library, featuring a reproduction of a painting by Sir Frank Bernard Dicksee entitled "Harmony". The window was created by Master craftsman John Henry Dearle.
West Vancouver Memorial Library was only narrowly voted in as the municipality's official War Memorial; second (by only one vote) was a Civic Center. Other possibilities included a hospital, a swimming pool, a chapel, a town clock, and a community gymnasium. The library is situated in the 1900 block of Marine Dr., and since it was officially opened in the year 1950, it was given the street number 1950 by the municipality.

Since the end of the War, West Vancouver's population had risen steadily, and after just five years of being open, the library was circulating 12.76 books per capita.  In 1957, Weekend Magazine published a photostory about West Vancouver Memorial Library entitled "North America's Busiest Library", and in 1960, The Vancouver Sun also proclaimed that the library was the "Most Busy Library in Canada".

Services
West Vancouver Memorial Library offers events and programs for all ages.

Children are welcome to attend Babytime, Tales for Twos, Storytime Fun (3Y-5Y), as well as Family Storytime—all of which feature a variety of stories, songs, action rhymes, and more.

Teens aged 12–15 are welcome to join the library's Teen Advisory Group (TAG).  One general meeting is held every month, as well as one event, project or workshop per month.  Past events/projects that the TAG has been involved with include:
 Teen Movie Night @ the Library
 Teen Rock Concert @ the Library
 BOOKtopia: the Children's Literature Festival of West Vancouver
 Book launches/Author readings
 Book, movie & music reviews & suggestions for the teen collection
 Summer Reading Club Medal Presentation Ceremony in September.

Teens are also welcome to participate in the library's Book Buddies program, which involves helping and encouraging children with their reading skills.

Adults are welcome to attend any number of the library's many programs including computer training seminars, database training, author readings, book clubs, slide shows, film viewings, book launches, along with a number of special events that might include a Wine Appreciation Evening, or a Photography Exhibition.
Information and reference services
Access to full text databases
Community information
Internet access
Reader's advisory services
Programs for children, youth and adults
Delivery to homebound individuals
Interlibrary loan
Free downloadable audiobooks

Collection

West Vancouver Memorial Library's collection of materials includes books, DVDs, CD-ROMs, historical photographs, microfilm, microfiche, newspapers, and magazines, along with a fairly extensive offering of CD's. Ebooks are also available on the West Vancouver Memorial Library's website through OverDrive.

The library has a number of multilingual materials including those in Chinese, Tagalog, Japanese, Spanish, Korean, French, and Persian.  With more than 2,500 books, West Vancouver Memorial Library has the largest and most comprehensive Persian collection in British Columbia.

The library also has a number of specialized databases including those associated with Business, Citizenship, Consumer Information, Education, Genealogy, Health & Medicine, History, Language & Literature, Law, Music, Religion & Philosophy, Science & Technology, and Statistics.

Art
The Art Gallery at the West Vancouver Memorial Library features rotating exhibitions by emerging artists. The Library also has a permanent art collection.

Music
Through a bequest from Robert Leslie Welsh, the West Vancouver Memorial Library has been able to offer a number of music-related programs, materials, and technologies for the general public.

The Library's Friday Night Concert Series features live music; concerts are free and open to all.

A collection of CDs is also available at the library, along with classical and popular music performances on DVD, a collection of music books and scores, an orchestra scores collection, and streaming music.

Friends of the Library
West Vancouver Memorial Library has been strongly supported by its Friends of the Library since 1950. The Friends are active volunteers and supporters working together to enrich the library programs, collections and services. Their efforts focus on fundraising projects and hospitality.

References

External links 
 WVML website

Public libraries in British Columbia
West Vancouver
Libraries established in 1950
1950 establishments in Canada